Emily Thorn Vanderbilt (January 31, 1852 – July 28, 1946) was an American philanthropist and a member of the prominent Vanderbilt family. She financed the creation of New York's Sloane Hospital for Women in 1888 with an endowment of more than $1,000,000.

Early life
She was born in 1852 as the fifth child, and second daughter, of William Henry Vanderbilt (1821–1885) and Maria Louisa Kissam (1821–1896). Her paternal grandparents were Cornelius Vanderbilt (1794–1877) and his wife, Sophia Johnson (1795–1868).

Philanthropy and work
She financed the creation of New York's Sloane Hospital for Women with an endowment of more than $1,000,000.  The hospital is now part of NewYork-Presbyterian / Morgan Stanley Children's Hospital and still in use today.

In 1885, she and her husband commissioned Peabody and Stearns to build Elm Court, the mammoth shingle-style 'cottage' in Lenox, Massachusetts.

Personal life
In 1872, the twenty year old Vanderbilt was married to William Douglas Sloane (1844–1915). Sloane was the brother of Henry T. Sloane of the carpet firm W. & J. Sloane, and together, Emily and William became the parents of three daughters and two sons, including:

 Florence Adele Sloane (1873–1960), wife of James Abercrombie Burden Jr. and of Richard Montgomery Tobin.
 Emily Vanderbilt Sloane (1874–1970), who married lawyer John Henry Hammond III.
 Lila Vanderbilt Sloane (1878–1934), wife of William Bradhurst Osgood Field.
 William Douglas Sloane (1883–1884)
 Malcolm Douglas Vanderbilt Sloane (1885–1924), who married Elinor Lee.

The family lived at the Vanderbilt Triple Palace on Fifth Avenue in New York City.

In 1920, after Sloane's death, she married Henry White (1850–1927), American Ambassador to France and Italy, and a signatory of the Treaty of Versailles.

She died on July 28, 1946, in Lenox, Massachusetts.

Descendants
Emily Thorn Vanderbilt Sloane White's grandchildren include Adele Hammond, paternal grandmother of actor Timothy Olyphant, Alice Frances Hammond, wife of jazz musician Benny Goodman, Rachel Hammond, cattle breeder, and wife of Manley D. Breck, and John Henry Hammond II, talent scout.

Family tree

References

1852 births
1946 deaths
Emily Thorn
American people of Dutch descent
Gilded Age
People included in New York Society's Four Hundred
Burials at the Vanderbilt Family Cemetery and Mausoleum